Sandton is a metro station on the Gautrain rapid transit system in Sandton, Johannesburg. It opened to traffic on 8 June 2010 with service to OR Tambo International Airport.

Location
Sandton station is located in the neighbourhood of the same name in northern Johannesburg, specifically near the Sandton City/Nelson Mandela Square developments at the intersection of Rivonia and West Streets.

Transit-oriented development
Developers and the Gauteng government aimed to make Sandton station the centre of one of the first transit-oriented development projects in South Africa. Because of the area's financial importance, with the Johannesburg Stock Exchange being a major focal point, and location near a number of important roads, such development also required an upgrade of the arterial road network in the surrounding area.

The area surrounding Sandton station was divided into six management areas, which cover land use, development density, and pedestrian accessibility. Management Area 1, bounded by Sandton Street, Katherine Street, Rivonia Road, and Fredman Drive, encircles Nelson Mandela Square and the immediate vicinity of the station and is planned to contain buildings of up to 40 storeys with a development density of 110 units per hectare, thus categorising it as high-density and mixed-use. In addition, a series of pedestrian corridors traverse the district, creating a grid to enable more pedestrian-friendly development and to encourage walking and sustainability. Subsequent and more distant management areas have lower height restrictions of ten to fifteen storeys while maintaining the 110 units per hectare density requirement, which centralises development towards a defined central business district.

Station layout
Architecturally, Sandton is unique amongst Gautrain stations. Although it is not the only underground station, it is the only one with a two-level platform arrangement. The upper level serves trains on the north–south axis of the system, with trains heading southbound to Park Station in central Johannesburg and northbound to Pretoria, while the lower level has only one platform and acts as the terminus for OR Tambo International Airport-bound trains.

Services
Sandton station is the operational hub of the Gautrain system. Along with Marlboro, it is one of only two stations in the entire network to be served by all trains on the Airport and north–south lines. In addition, Sandton also has six additional feeder bus routes bringing passengers from more distant areas to the station. Numbered S1 to S6, the buses travel to/from Wendywood (S2), Rivonia (S3), Randburg (S4), Fourways (S5), and Rosebank (S6), as well as a Sandton CBD loop (S1).

References

External links
Official Sandton station site

Gautrain
Railway stations in South Africa
Railway stations opened in 2010
Buildings and structures in Johannesburg
Transport in Johannesburg
Railway stations in South Africa opened in the 21st century